Lionel Mallier (born 6 March 1974) is a French former international rugby union player.  He made five appearances for France during his career, between 1999 and 2000, including one substitute appearance at the 1999 Rugby World Cup.

References

1974 births
Living people
French rugby union players
Rugby union flankers
France international rugby union players
Sportspeople from Grenoble